Grarem Gouga District is a district of Mila Province, Algeria.

The district is further divided into 2 municipalities:
Grarem Gouga
Hamala

Districts of Mila Province